Benjamin "Ben" Schumacher is an American theoretical physicist, working mostly in the field of quantum information theory.

He discovered a way of interpreting quantum states as information. He came up with a way of compressing the information in a state, and storing the information in a smaller number of states. This is now known as Schumacher compression. This was the quantum analog of Shannon's noiseless coding theorem, and it helped to start the field known as quantum information theory.

Schumacher is also credited with inventing the term qubit along with William Wootters of Williams College, which is to quantum computation as a bit is to traditional computation.

He is the author of Physics in Spacetime, a textbook on Special Relativity, and Quantum Processes, Systems, and Information (with Michael Westmoreland),  a textbook on Quantum Mechanics. Schumacher is a professor of physics at Kenyon College, a liberal arts college in rural Ohio. He is the lecturer in four courses produced by the Teaching Company: Black Holes, Tides, and Curved Spacetime: Understanding Gravity; Quantum Mechanics: The Physics of the Microscopic World; Impossible: Physics Beyond the Edge;  and The Science of Information: From Language to Black Holes.

Schumacher earned his bachelor's degree at Hendrix College, where he met his wife, mathematician Carol Schumacher. His Ph.D. is from the University of Texas at Austin, where his advisers were Richard Matzner and John Archibald Wheeler.

Influential research papers

See also
Classical capacity

References

External links
Zeroth Order Approximation - Blog by Benjamin Schumacher
Benjamin Schumacher Homepage
Quantum Mechanics: The Physics of the Microscopic World
The Physics of Impossible Things, Speaker: Ben Schumacher, 03/12/2008, PIRSA - Perimeter Institute Recorded Seminar Archive

Living people
Year of birth missing (living people)
21st-century American physicists
Hendrix College alumni
University of Texas at Austin alumni
Kenyon College faculty
Quantum information scientists
Fellows of the American Physical Society